Albert Farmer  (born 1864) was an English footballer who played in the Football League for Stoke.

Career
Farmer was born in Stoke-upon-Trent but started his career with Everton. He moved back home just before the start of the Football League and signed for his hometown club Stoke but only played once during the 1888–89 season in a FA Cup defeat to Warwick County. He managed three league appearances the following season before leaving the club in February 1890.

Career statistics

References

English footballers
Everton F.C. players
Stoke City F.C. players
English Football League players
Year of death missing
1864 births
Association football wing halves